This was the first edition of the tournament.

Sadio Doumbia and Fabien Reboul won the title after defeating Luca Margaroli and Gonçalo Oliveira 7–5, 4–6, [10–6] in the final.

Seeds

Draw

References

External links
 Main draw

Internazionali di Tennis Città di Verona - Doubles